Modern equipment of the Italian Army is a list of military equipment currently in service with the Italian Army.

Standard issue weapons

Small Arms

Combat knives

Personal equipment

NBCR systems

Night sight systems

Hand grenade

Anti-tank, anti-structure and anti-air weapons

Special Forces issue

Combat vehicles

Armoured vehicles

Artillery

Mortars

Air-defence

Engineering vehicles

EOD/IEDD systems

Electronics and communications

Logistic vehicles

Airport logistic vehicles

Logistic trailers

Containerized systems

Riverine boats

Light vehicles

Utility vehicles

Aircraft inventory

See also
 Italian Armed Forces

References

External links
 Official Website of the Italian Army

Italian Army
Italian Army
Equipment